"Archetype" is a song by American heavy metal band Fear Factory, released from the album of the same title. The single was released on the same day as the album itself, on April 19, 2004. It is the fifth track of the album and was also included on the MTV2 Headbangers Ball, Vol. 2 compilation in September 2004. Months prior to the release of Fear Factory's studio album, however, an exclusive remix of "Archetype" was included on The Texas Chainsaw Massacre: The Album in November 2003. This version features a more electronic sound and softer ending.

A music video was produced for the song and was featured on TV programs such as MTV2's Headbangers Ball upon release.

Song meaning and lyrics 
"Archetype" is directed at Fear Factory ex-guitarist Dino Cazares: "The infection has been removed/The soul of this machine has improved." Frontman Burton C. Bell has said in an interview that "'Archetype,' defines what Fear Factory is, completely. It has classic Fear Factory parts, and the heavy/melodic vocals, but without being forced or contrived."

The song is about making things real by seeing them. The song ends after 'open your eyes, open your eyes' for seven straight lines.

Track listing 
 "Archetype" (Radio Version) — 3:51
 "Archetype" (Album Version) — 4:35

References

External links
"Archetype" music video on YouTube

Fear Factory songs
2004 singles
2004 songs
Songs written by Burton C. Bell
Alternative metal songs